Lieutenant-General Alexander Donald Meinzinger  is a retired senior Royal Canadian Air Force officer who was Commander of the Royal Canadian Air Force from 2018 until 2022.

Career

Meinzinger joined the Canadian Forces in 1985 through the Regular Officer Training Plan where he received a Bachelor of Arts Honours degree in Economics and Commerce from the Royal Military College of Canada. After serving as commander of 403 (Helicopter) Operational Training Squadron, he was deployed to Afghanistan as commander of Canada's Joint Task Force Afghanistan Air Wing in 2011. He went on to be Deputy Director of Strategy, Policy and Plans at North American Aerospace Defense Command / United States Northern Command in June 2012, commandant of the Royal Military College of Canada in July 2013 and Deputy Commander of the Royal Canadian Air Force in May 2015. After that he became Director of Staff, Strategic Joint Staff in March 2017 and Commander of the Royal Canadian Air Force in May 2018. Meinzinger retired from the Canadian Armed Forces in August 2022.

Military awards

Notes

References

External links

Royal Canadian Air Force - Lieutenant-General A.D. Meinzinger, CMM, MSM, CD

Year of birth missing (living people)
Living people
Royal Canadian Air Force generals
Commanders of the Order of Military Merit (Canada)